Enna Muthalali Sowkiyama is a 1972 Indian Tamil-language film directed by Malliyam Rajagopal and produced by D. K. Sankar under Anna Productions. The film stars Gemini Ganesan and K. R. Vijaya. It was released on 11 February 1972.

Plot 
Koteeswaram is a textile mill owner whose goondas murder Muthiah, secretary of the mill labour union, for demanding bonus and declaring a strike. Muthiah's daughter Jaya, a medical student, is in love with Koteeswaram's son without knowing his identity. Another worker is arrested for Muthiah's murder and his son Sethu and Jaya vow to find out the murderer of Muthiah. Koteeswaram is finally brought to book.

Cast 
Adapted from Film World:
 Gemini Ganesan
 K. R. Vijaya
 Major Sundarrajan
 Nagesh
 Jayabharathi
 T. R. Ramachandran
 V. S. Raghavan
 M. R. R. Vasu
 Ganthimathi
 M. Bhanumathi
 Vijaya Lalitha

Themes 
Enna Muthalali Sowkiyama deals with labour unrest.

Soundtrack 

The soundtrack of the film was composed by M. S. Viswanathan.

References

External links 
 

1970s Tamil-language films
1972 films
Films about labour
Films scored by M. S. Viswanathan